Qermezin (also Romanized as Qermezīn; also known as Qermezī and Qīrramzīn) is a village in Kuhpayeh Rural District, Nowbaran District, Saveh County, Markazi Province, Iran. At the 2006 census, its population was 184, in 82 families.

References 

Populated places in Saveh County